Algar is a city in the province of Cádiz, Spain. According to the 2005 census, the city has 1,644 inhabitants. Algar is in the White Towns of Andalusia to an altitude of 212 meters.

Demographics

Monuments
Iglesia Parroquial de Santa María de Guadalupe.
Plaza de Toros de Algar.
Puerta de Alcalá.

Economy
Agriculture
Animal husbandry
Fur trade
Wood
Rural tourism

References

External links 

Ayuntamiento de Algar
Algar - Sistema de Información Multiterritorial de Andalucía

  - Spanish village seeks Unesco world heritage status for outdoor chats

Municipalities of the Province of Cádiz